Eimantas Bendžius (born 23 April 1990) is a Lithuanian professional basketball player for Dinamo Sassari of the Italian Lega Basket Serie A (LBA). His primary position is small forward, but he can also play as a power forward, if needed.

Professional career
Bendžius started his career with Vilnius playing in the NKL in 2008. During the 2009–10 season, he became one of the leaders of Perlas, a team that debuted in the LKL that season. On June 2, 2010, Bendžius joined Lietuvos rytas Vilnius.

Bendžius became one of the key players for Lietuvos rytas during the 2012–13 LKL season. In an important game against the rival Žalgiris Kaunas, Bendžius hit 6 out of 9 three-pointers to overcome Žalgiris. Because of this win, Lietuvos rytas secured a second place in the regular season and avoided meeting Žalgiris before the finals.

In June 2015, Bendžius signed a two-year contract with the Spanish team Río Natura Monbús Obradoiro.

On July 10, 2018, he has signed with Rytas Vilnius of the Lithuanian Basketball League.

On July 7, 2020, he has signed with Dinamo Sassari of the Italian Lega Basket Serie A (LBA).

National team career
Bendžius represented Lithuania at the 2009 FIBA Under-19 World Championship. In the game against Kazakhstan, Bendžius scored 21 points. He later participated at the 2013 Summer Universiade in Kazan, Russia, as part of the Lithuania students' basketball team.

Bendžius represented primary Lithuania men's national basketball team during the EuroBasket 2017 for the first time and averaged 2.5 points, 2.5 rebounds and 0.5 assists.

References

1990 births
Living people
Basketball players from Klaipėda
BC Pieno žvaigždės players
BC Rytas players
Dinamo Sassari players
Liga ACB players
Lithuanian expatriate basketball people in Italy
Lithuanian expatriate basketball people in Poland
Lithuanian expatriate basketball people in Spain
Lithuanian men's basketball players
Obradoiro CAB players
Small forwards
Trefl Sopot players